George Broome Clarke (11 April 1886 – 21 December 1946) was an English comedian, best known in the 1930s for his sketch "My First Car".

Biography
He was born in Bromley, Kent.  He began performing in 1894 with his father, as comedians and dancers, billed as "George Clarke and His Half" and later as "Clarke and Clements".  When his father retired in 1910, George Clarke became a solo act, billed as "The Dude Comedian".  According to one later review: "He was a master in the art of giving full rein to the most priceless verbal inanities, was always impeccably attired on the stage, and with his monocle typified the 'silly ass' character... [He] had the art of creating laughter by exploiting the nit-wit, and never resorted to blue material...".  He toured in South Africa, Australia, and the U.S., as well as in Britain, and played in a series of revues produced by Harry Day between 1913 and 1923. 

His most famous sketch was "His First Car", in which he would drive a standard production-line Austin 7 car on stage, and "expertly manoeuvre [it]... through his skilful use of the gears and brakes."   The sketch was used in a theatrical production, Darling, I Love You!.  According to one writer:The car was... quite standard except for a very high coachwork finish, in yellow and blue. He would drive the car straight at the footlights, with the audience, especially in the front rows, in a state of panic-stricken terror. From first gear he would whip it straight into reverse, the back would leap up in characteristic fashion, then the scrabbling rear wheels would grip the boards and the car shot backwards, to the vast relief of musicians and audience. Later he used a car with the 4-speed box, still absolutely standard and unmodified. This was, of course, a much more difficult change, but he told me that he had never missed it although always expecting to. Now and again he would overdo it, and shoot over the edge, when the gentlemen of the orchestra managed to achieve the most remarkable sideways long-jumps from a sitting position, which alone were well worth the price of admission. Very occasionally he would break a half-shaft, but had no other trouble.  The scene was the back garden of a suburban villa, and he concluded the act by driving right through a “brick” wall, which brought the house down on both sides of the footlights.  He performed this sketch at the Royal Command Performances held at the London Palladium in 1930, 1932, and 1934, and it was filmed as My First Car, directed by Monty Banks in 1930. 

Clarke later appeared in musical comedy shows in the West End, and on tour.  He died in Maidenhead, Berkshire, in 1946 at the age of 60.

References

External links
 Short film showing part of Clarke's act, 1930

1886 births
1946 deaths
20th-century English comedians
English male comedians
Music hall performers